John Paul Lwanji (born 1 March 1949) is a Tanzanian CCM politician and Member of Parliament for Manyoni West constituency since 2005.

References

1949 births
Living people
Chama Cha Mapinduzi MPs
Tanzanian MPs 2010–2015
Bihawana Secondary School alumni
Tabora Boys Secondary School alumni
Mzumbe University alumni